NGC 35 is a spiral galaxy in the constellation Cetus. It was discovered on November 21, 1886 by the astronomer Lewis A. Swift.

References

External links
 
 

Galaxies discovered in 1886
0035
000784
-02-01-033
Unbarred spiral galaxies
NGC 0035
18861121